Ricardo Pietreczko (born 20 October 1994) is a German professional darts player.

He reached the last 32 of the 2018 World Masters. He made his PDC European Tour debut in the 2018 International Darts Open, where he lost 6–4 to eventual quarter-finalist Ryan Searle.

He won a PDC Tour Card for the 2022 and 2023 seasons at Q-School 2022. He reached his first PDC Pro Tour semi-final at Player Championship 28 2022.

Performance timeline

PDC European Tour

References

External links

1994 births
Living people
German darts players
Professional Darts Corporation current tour card holders